Maurice Compte (born in 1969) is an American actor known for his roles as Gaff in Breaking Bad, Santiago "Big Evil" Flores in End of Watch, and as Colonel Carrillo in Narcos.

Early life 
Born and raised in New Orleans, Compte is the son of Cuban migrants.

Career 
Compte has been active as an actor since 1996. He first appeared in series such as Chicago Hope  and Pacific Blue. This was followed by minor roles in movies like Before Night Falls and Double Whammy. Compte's first recurring role was as Charlie Gutierrez in the series E-Ring from 2005. Other guest appearances as in Monk and NCIS: Los Angeles followed. In 2011 he portrayed cartel member Gaff in the hit television series Breaking Bad. A year later, he was seen in End of Watch. Other roles in series such as Bones followed, before playing the role of Danny Ortiz in 2014 alongside Liam Neeson in the movie A Walk Among the Tombstones. In 2015, he gained more prominence as Horacio Carrillo in the Netflix series Narcos.

He also starred as Diego Jimenez on the Starz drama Power (2014–2020) and later as Kevin Jimenez on Mayans M.C. (2018), the spinoff of the FX television series Sons of Anarchy.

Filmography

Film

Television

References

External links
 

1969 births
Living people
21st-century American male actors
American male film actors
American male television actors
American people of Cuban descent
20th-century American male actors
Male actors from New Orleans